"Going, Going, Gone" is a song by American country music singer Luke Combs. It was released on October 24, 2022 as the third single from his third studio album Growin' Up. Combs wrote the song with Ray Fulcher and James McNair, and produced it with Chip Matthews and Jonathan Singleton.

History
Combs wrote the song "Going, Going, Gone" with Ray Fulcher and James McNair. Combs said that he was inspired by Tracy Chapman's "Fast Car", as he thought the song had a memorable riff and he wanted to capture a similar mood. It is also the first song in his career where he plays his own guitar, instead of relying on session musicians. Combs said that he considered it one of his favorite songs. Clayton Edwards of Outsider thought it was conceptually different from Combs' earlier material, stating that "He’s done heartbreak songs before. However, he usually paired that pain with booze or a tell-off to the ex. This one, though, sees Combs accepting that his love is leaving." Following the song's release to radio in October 2022, Combs released an acoustic version two months later.

Charts

References

2022 songs
2022 singles
Columbia Records singles
Luke Combs songs
Songs written by Luke Combs
Country ballads